"I Promise" is a song by the English rock band Radiohead, released in 2017. Radiohead performed it on their 1996 tour, and recorded it during the sessions for their third album, OK Computer (1997), but felt it was not strong enough to release. In June 2017, "I Promise" was included on the OK Computer reissue OKNOTOK 1997 2017 and released as a download with a music video.

History 
Radiohead first performed "I Promise" on 27 March 1996 at the Fillmore in San Francisco, and played it several times that year while touring in support of Alanis Morissette. Bootleg recordings were widely circulated.

Radiohead recorded "I Promise" during the sessions for their third album, OK Computer (1997), but felt it was not strong enough to release. In 1998, the guitarist Ed O’Brien suggested that Radiohead could rerecord "I Promise" for their next album, but it remained unreleased. After the release of their seventh album, In Rainbows (2007), O'Brien said they had abandoned it.

On 23 June 2017, Radiohead released a 20th-anniversary OK Computer reissue, OKNOTOK 1997 2017, featuring "I Promise" and two other new tracks. "I Promise" premiered on BBC Radio 6 on 2 June; the host, Steve Lamacq, said that Radiohead had been "especially pleased to find [it] in the vaults, because they thought it'd been lost over the years". That day, Radiohead released an "I Promise" music video on their website and made the song available to download to those who had pre-ordered OKNOTOK.

On tour in June 2017, Radiohead performed "I Promise" for the first time in 21 years. The songwriter, Thom Yorke, told the crowd: "What a bunch of nutters we were, and probably still are ... One of the crazy things we did was not release this song, because we didn't think it was good enough."

Composition 
"I Promise" features strummed acoustic guitar, marching band-like drums, and orchestral Mellotron tones. The lyrics see Yorke "listing off vows like a shopping list", with themes common to OK Computer including loneliness, alienation, paranoia and heartache. O'Brien likened it to Roy Orbison, while Yorke likened it to Joy Division. NME described "I Promise" as "Radiohead at their most direct" before they moved into electronic music with later albums.

Music video 
The "I Promise" music video was directed by Michal Marczak, who had previously directed a video vignette for Radiohead's ninth album, A Moon Shaped Pool (2016), and the video for "Beautiful People" by Mark Pritchard, featuring Yorke. The video depicts a nighttime bus journey through Warsaw, with one passenger as a detached animatronic head. Robin Hilton of NPR interpreted the video as a reference to the isolation and "gruelling" schedule Yorke experienced on the OK Computer tour.

Reception 
Pitchfork named "I Promise" the week's "Best New Music", writing that if Radiohead had released it in 1997 "it might've been inescapable in dorm rooms, at open mic nights, and wherever else sensitive guys with guitars are found ... It doesn't much reinvent the group's The Bends-era iteration, as the technological lyrical themes and gloomy production of OK Computer would. But it's stunning all the same."

Charts

Personnel

Radiohead
Colin Greenwood
Jonny Greenwood
Ed O'Brien
Philip Selway
Thom Yorke

Additional personnel
Chris Blair – mastering
Stanley Donwood – illustrations
Nigel Godrich – production, engineering
Nick Ingman – conducting
Jim Warren – production, engineering

References

2017 songs
Radiohead songs
Song recordings produced by Nigel Godrich
Songs written by Thom Yorke
Songs written by Jonny Greenwood
Songs written by Colin Greenwood
Songs written by Ed O'Brien
Songs written by Philip Selway
XL Recordings singles